Ręczno  is a village in Piotrków County, Łódź Voivodeship, in central Poland. It is the seat of the gmina (administrative district) called Gmina Ręczno.

The village has a population of approximately 690 people.

References

Villages in Piotrków County